The 1991 San Francisco 49ers season was the franchise's 42nd season in the National Football League (NFL) and their 46th overall. The franchise did not qualify for the postseason for the first time since the strike-shortened 1982 season. Joe Montana would miss the entire season with an elbow injury, paving the way for Steve Young to take over as the team's starting quarterback.

In Week 17, the 49ers found themselves not controlling their destiny. The Atlanta Falcons had already swept the 49ers in 2 very close games in the regular season, and therefore held the tiebreaker in the wild card. The New Orleans Saints had a 10–5 record entering the week, and defeated the Phoenix Cardinals, winning the division.

Offseason 
Following the 1990 season, the 49ers left team stalwarts Roger Craig and Ronnie Lott unprotected and allowed them go to the Los Angeles Raiders via Plan B free agency.

In 1991, the 49ers announced a prototype for a new logo and helmet design. Instead of the traditional "SF" oval, this new logo featured a stylized "49ers" in white with black and red shadows. However, fan reaction was so overwhelmingly negative that the idea was scrapped six days later. The only change to the uniform would be the switching from red socks with three white stripes to plain solid red socks.

NFL Draft

Personnel

Staff

Roster

Regular season 
With Joe Montana out for the season with an elbow injury, Steve Young became the starting quarterback. The season opener, a rematch of the previous year's NFC Championship with the New York Giants, was the first road loss suffered by the 49ers since losing at Phoenix in 1988. The loss ended a still-standing NFL record 18 consecutive regular season road game victories spanning the 1988–90 seasons. The first month of the season saw the team inconsistent with alternating home wins and road losses. In week 10 against the Atlanta Falcons, Young suffered a knee injury, causing him to miss five games. With Young out and with the 49ers record at 4–5, Steve Bono led the 49ers to five wins in 6 games. However, Young returned for the final game; a 52–14 victory over the Chicago Bears. Although the 49ers finished the regular season at 10–6, they missed the playoffs for the first time since 1982 (losing on a tie-breaker to the Atlanta Falcons due to having lost both meetings). Young would however win the first of four passing titles.

Schedule

Standings

Awards and records 
 Steve Young, Led NFL, Passer Rating, 101.8 Rating

References

External links 
 1991 49ers on Pro Football Reference
 49ers Schedule on jt-sw.com

San Francisco
San Francisco 49ers seasons
San
1991 in San Francisco